Goodbye, Raggedy Ann is a 1971 American made-for-television drama film starring Mia Farrow, Hal Holbrook, John Colicos, Marlene Warfield, and Martin Sheen.

Plot
Brooke Collier (Farrow) is an unstable Hollywood starlet who still clings to her ragdoll like a child, despite the rising amount of very adult problems in her life - her career has stalled, she is having an affair with a married man (Flanders), and she suffers violent, irrational mood swings. In an attempt to rebound from her life's failings, she accepts a marriage proposal from a millionaire (Colicos). Throughout all of her internal, and occasionally external, conflicts, her only friend is a frustrated writer and neighbor, Harlan Webb (Holbrook). As Brooke's situation and temperament become increasingly dire, Harlan may be the only one who can save her from herself.

Cast
Mia Farrow as Brooke Collier
Hal Holbrook as Harlan Webb
John Colicos as Paul Jamison
Marlene Warfield as Louise Walters
Ed Flanders as David Bevin
Martin Sheen as Jules Worthman
Walter Koenig as Jerry

External links
 

1971 television films
1971 films
1971 drama films
Films about suicide
Films about actors
CBS network films
Films directed by Fielder Cook
Films shot in Los Angeles
Films with screenplays by Jack Sher
American drama television films
1970s English-language films
1970s American films